Space Spartans is a space combat simulator video game released for Intellivision, initially programmed by Brian Dougherty, and completed by William C. Fisher and Steve Roney. It is first game which supported the Intellivoice voice synthesis module. Space Spartans is heavily based on Star Raiders, a game released in 1979 for the Atari 8-bit family.

Gameplay

The objective of Space Spartans is to survive as long as possible against a never-ending onslaught of alien enemies, while defending a set of star bases given at the start of the game.  The player flies a solo fighter craft, which navigates the Sector Grid and shoots down enemy fighters.

The player's ship consists of five systems: Shields, which reduce damage; Hyper Drive, which allows the ship to jump to different grid sectors; Impulse Drive, which allows the ship to move; the Tracking Computer, which locks on to and attempts to follow enemies; and the Battle Computer, which automatically fires at enemies and keeps the ship's laser beams centered.  Each of these systems can be turned on and off, and can take damage when the ship is hit by enemy fire, making it less effective or more costly to use.  The ship can repair its systems automatically, but while a system is under repair, it rapidly switches on and off, greatly reducing its effectiveness during battle.  All actions (including leaving the repair system on when at full health) use energy, of which the ship has a limited supply.

The player can jump to any of their star bases to quickly repair damaged systems and recharge energy.  Additionally, the ship's computer provides valuable information to the player via speech synthesis, including the status of its systems, the number of enemies in the current sector, and the amount of energy the ship has remaining.  If a star base comes under attack, the player is notified with a repeating verbal alert.

At the start of each round, the player places their three star bases (or whichever ones still remain) on the grid, then play commences.  The player then jumps around the grid to attack enemy squadrons and bases.  When attacking, the player shifts to a cockpit view to aim and fire at enemies and avoid enemy fire.  At times during the game, the player may need to leave a battle to jump elsewhere, e.g. to defend a star base or quickly repair damage.  There is no way to "beat" the game; it ends when the player's ship is destroyed or runs out of energy.

References

1982 video games
Intellivision games
Intellivision-only games
North America-exclusive video games
Space combat simulators